Herodotia is a genus of wasps belonging to the family Agaonidae.

The species of this genus are found in Australasia.

Species:

Herodotia procopii 
Herodotia subatriventris

References

Agaonidae